Sibille Attar (born 27 November 1981 in Örebro, Sweden) is a Swedish singer and songwriter and producer of French origin. She released her self produced EP The Flower's Bed on Stranded record label in 2012 which earned her a Grammy nomination for "Best Newcomer" the same year. It was followed by her self produced debut album Sleepyhead in 2013 also on Stranded label.
In 2018, she released the 6 track EP Paloma’s Hand on indie label Pnkslm Recordings.

Attar was born in Örebro and moved to Stockholm at the age of 15. She was a member of various musical bands including Stockholm-based band The Tourettes from 2001 to 2008, and Norrköping-founded band Speedmarket Avenue from 2005 to 2009. In 2010, she became a member of the band [ingenting]. She is also active under the name Little Red Corvette. Attar has collaborated with a number of other artists such as Camera Obscura, David Lindh, Jonathan Johansson, Shadow Shadow and The Bear Quartet.

Discography

Albums

EPs
2012: The Flower's Bed
2018: Paloma's Hand

References

External links
Official website

Swedish women singers
English-language singers from Sweden
1981 births
Living people